Flavio Cipolla and Marcel Granollers were the defenders of championship title, but Granollers decided to not participate this year, he played in Barcelona with Nicolás Almagro.
Cipolla chose to play with Simone Vagnozzi, and won in the final 6–3, 6–3, against Paolo Lorenzi and Giancarlo Petrazzuolo.

Seeds

Draw

Draw

References
 Doubles Draw

Roma Open - Doubles
2008 Doubles